Osvaldo Augusto Brandão (18 September 1916 – 29 July 1989) was a Brazilian football player and coach who managed Brazil in 1955, 1956, and 1957, and from 1975 to 1977 and the Sociedade Esportiva Palmeiras in several times.

Brandão was born in Taquara, Rio Grande do Sul. He also coached Cruzeiro, Palmeiras, Corinthians, São Paulo, Portuguesa, Santos, Botafogo-SP, Portuguesa Santista, Vila Nova-GO, Independiente and Peñarol.

Honours 
Palmeiras
 Campeonato Paulista: 1947, 1959, 1972, 1974
 Campeonato Brasileiro Série A: 1960, 1972, 1973

São Paulo
 Campeonato Paulista: 1971

Corinthians
 Torneio Rio-São Paulo: 1953, 1954, 1966
 Campeonato Paulista: 1954, 1977

Portuguesa
Fita Azul: https:1951

Independiente
 Argentine Primera División: 1967

References

Sportspeople from Rio Grande do Sul
1916 births
1989 deaths
Brazilian footballers
Association football midfielders
Brazilian football managers
Campeonato Brasileiro Série A players
Campeonato Brasileiro Série A managers
Argentine Primera División managers
Uruguayan Primera División managers
Sport Club Internacional players
Sociedade Esportiva Palmeiras players
Sociedade Esportiva Palmeiras managers
Santos FC managers
Associação Portuguesa de Desportos managers
Sport Club Corinthians Paulista managers
Brazil national football team managers
Club Atlético Independiente managers
São Paulo FC managers
Peñarol managers
Cruzeiro Esporte Clube managers
Vila Nova Futebol Clube managers
Brazilian expatriate football managers
Brazilian expatriate sportspeople in Argentina
Expatriate football managers in Argentina
Brazilian expatriate sportspeople in Uruguay
Expatriate football managers in Uruguay
1975 Copa América managers